Riho Terras (born 17 April 1967) is an Estonian politician and a former military officer who is serving as a member of the European Parliament since 1 February 2020.  He was the  Commander of the Estonian Defence Forces from 2011 to 2018. He was promoted to general in 2017.

He was elected as a Member of the European Parliament in 2019 and took his seat after Brexit.

Military career
His military education includes studies in the Royal College of Defence Studies in the United Kingdom, the Joint Command and General Staff Course in the Baltic Defence College, the European Security. Policy Course in the Geneva Centre for Security Policy, a Battalion Commander's Course in Switzerland, a Company Commander's course in Germany, a Company Commander's course in Sweden and the Officer's Basic course in Estonia. Terras's civilian education includes history studies in the University of Tartu, and a master's degree in Political Science and Sociology from the University of Bundeswehr.

After graduating from the Basic Officer's Course in Estonia, Terras served as a Company Commander and as a Battalion Second in Command of the Kalev Single Infantry Battalion from 1992 to 1993. Between 1993 and 1994 Terras served as the commander of the Põhja Single Infantry Company. After graduating from the Bundeswehr University (Germany) he served as the commander of the Guard Battalion from 1998 to 2000. Terras was appointed the Chief of Staff of the Defence League Headquarters in 2000. From 2001 to 2004 he served as the Estonian Defence Attaché in Germany and Poland. Between 2005 and 2008 Terras served as the Chief of the Analysis and Planning Department and as Chief of the Planning Section, Analysis and Planning Department in the Estonian Defence Forces Headquarters. In 2007, Terras served in the NATO Training Mission - Iraq as Deputy Chief of Staff. Riho Terras was confirmed in December 2008 as Permanent Secretary of the Estonian Ministry of Defence. Before taking up the position of the Permanent Secretary, he was Deputy Chief of Staff for Operations in the Estonian Defence Forces. Terras served as the Deputy Chief of Staff for Operations of the Estonian Defence forces from January 2011 to March 2011 and then continued his service as the Chief of Staff of the Estonian Defence Forces. Terras was appointed the Chief of Defence from 5 December 2011

Education

1989-1993, University of Tartu, History studies, Tartu, Estonia
1991-1992, Officer's Basic course, Tallinn, Estonia
1993, Company Commander's course, Sweden
1996, Company Commander's course, Germany
1994-1998, University of Bundeswehr, master's degree in Political Science and Sociology, Munich, Germany
1999, Battalion Commander's Course, Switzerland
2000, Estonian National Defence Course, Tartu, Estonia
2000, Geneva Centre for Security Policy, Policy Course, Geneva, Switzerland
2005, Baltic Defence College, Joint Command and General Staff Course, Tartu, Estonia
2010, Royal College of Defence Studies, London, United Kingdom

Effective dates of promotion

Assignment History

Awards, decorations, and recognition

Awards and decorations

Personal

In his youth, Terras was conscripted as a sailor in the Soviet Navy. He later studied history at University of Tartu, during which he also became a member of the Estonian Defence League. He joined Johannes Kert in the defence of radio and television buildings in Tallinn during the 1991 Soviet coup d'état attempt. Due to a lack of personnel in the Defence League, he decided to join a course for reserve officers, where he studied alongside Leo Kunnas. He was soon persuaded by Ants Laaneots to become a member of the Estonian Defence Forces. In 1994 he started studying at the Bundeswehr University Munich, where he received a master's degree in Political Science and Sociology. Thus he picked up where he had left off in his education after his time at the University of Tartu. In addition to the Estonian language Terras is fluent in English, German and Russian. He is married with two sons. His eldest sons name is Hendrik Johannes - in honor of Johannes Kert. His hobbies include opera, medieval history and hunting.

References

External links

|-
 

1967 births
Estonian generals
Isamaa politicians
Knights Commander of the Order of Merit of the Federal Republic of Germany
Living people
Members of the Riigikogu, 2023–2027
MEPs for Estonia 2019–2024
Officiers of the Légion d'honneur
People from Kohtla-Järve
Recipients of the Badge of Honour of the Bundeswehr
Recipients of the Legion of Merit
Recipients of the Military Order of the Cross of the Eagle, Class IV
Recipients of the Order of Merit of the Republic of Poland
Recipients of the Order of the Lion of Finland